Krzysztof Frankowski (born August 24, 1959 in Kozyle) is a former Polish football player. He played four times for Poland.

References

Sources

1959 births
Living people
Polish footballers
Poland international footballers
Poland youth international footballers
Stal Mielec players
FC Nantes players
Le Havre AC players
Expatriate footballers in France
Ligue 1 players
Polish expatriate footballers
Place of birth missing (living people)
Association football defenders